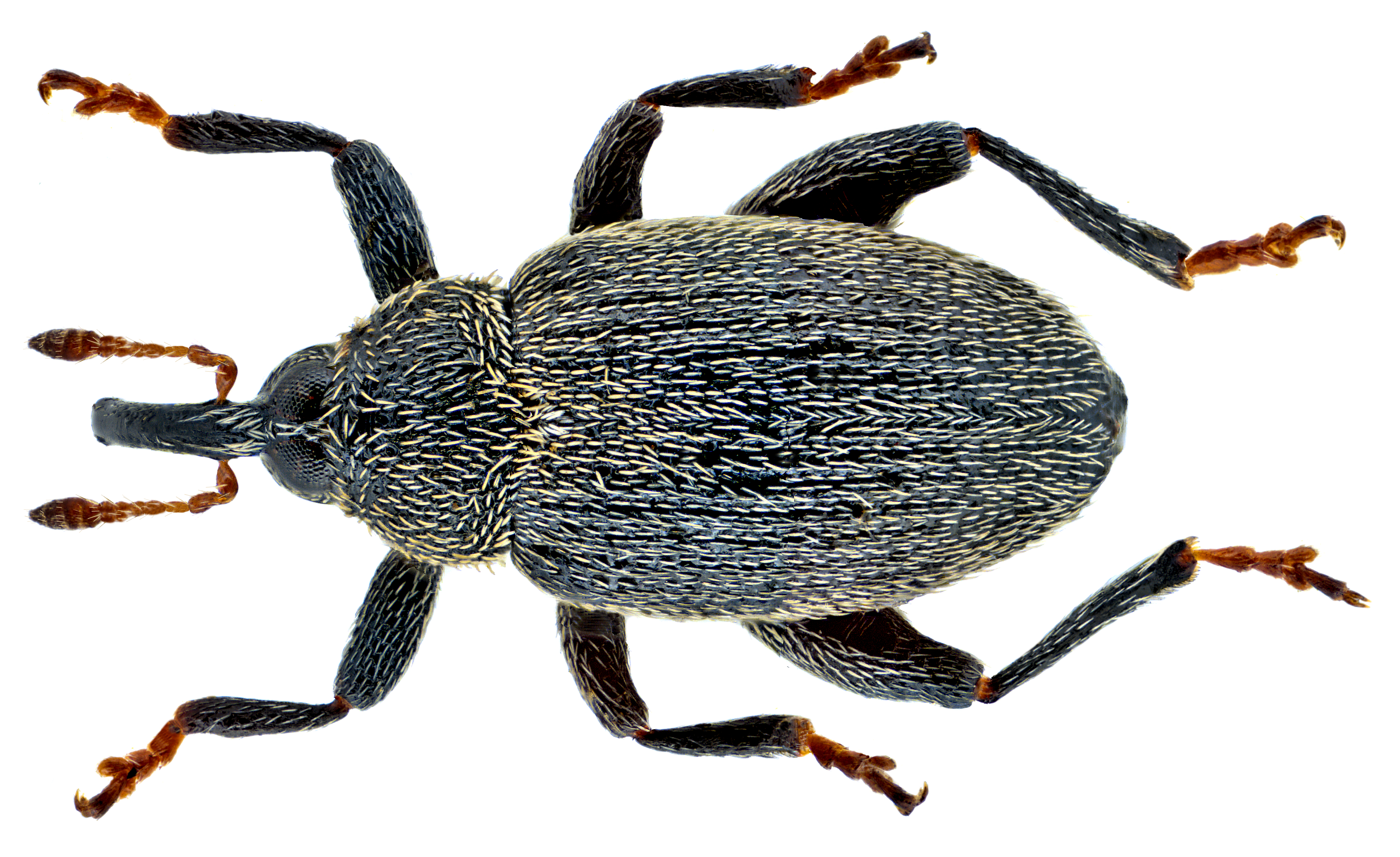
- Pseudorchestes pratensis beetle

Scientific classification
- Domain: Eukaryota
- Kingdom: Animalia
- Phylum: Arthropoda
- Class: Insecta
- Order: Coleoptera
- Suborder: Polyphaga
- Infraorder: Cucujiformia
- Family: Curculionidae
- Genus: Pseudorchestes; Bedel, 1894

= Pseudorchestes =

Genus of beetles

Pseudorchestes is a genus of beetles belonging to the family Curculionidae.

The species of this genus are found in Southern Europe.

Species:

- Pseudorchestes abdurakhmanovi Korotyaev, 1991
- Pseudorchestes amplithorax E.Reitter, 1911
